Hungary has 3,152 municipalities as of July 15, 2013: 346 towns (Hungarian term: város, plural: városok; the terminology doesn't distinguish between cities and towns – the term town is used in official translations) and 2,806 villages (Hungarian: község, plural: községek) of which 126 are classified as large villages (Hungarian: nagyközség, plural: nagyközségek). The number of towns can change, since villages can be elevated to town status by act of the President. The capital Budapest has a special status and is not included in any county while 25 of the towns are so-called cities with county rights. All county seats except Budapest are cities with county rights.

Four of the cities (Budapest, Miskolc, Győr, and Pécs) have agglomerations, and the Hungarian Statistical Office distinguishes seventeen other areas in earlier stages of agglomeration development.

The largest city is the capital, Budapest, while the smallest town is Pálháza with 1038 inhabitants (2010). The largest village is Solymár (population: 10,123 as of 2010). There are more than 100 villages with fewer than 100 inhabitants while the smallest villages have fewer than 20 inhabitants.

Largest cities in Hungary

Bold: City with county rights.

Over 100,000 (large cities)

100,000–50,000 (medium-sized cities)

50,000–30,000

29,000 – 24,000  
Sources:

All other towns in Hungary 
Sources:
24,000 – 15,000

15,000 – 5,000

< 5,000

Largest cities in Hungary in 1910
In 1910, the ten largest cities in the Kingdom of Hungary (including Croatia-Slavonia) were:

1. Budapest (the capital of Hungary): 880,371
2. Szeged: 118,328
3. Szabadka (now located in Serbia): 94,610
4. Debreczen: 92,729
5. Zágráb (then located in the Kingdom of Croatia-Slavonia, today in Croatia): 79,038
6. Pozsony (now located in Slovakia): 78,223
7. Temesvár (now located in Romania): 72,555
8. Kecskemét: 66,834
9. Arad (now located in Romania): 63,166
10. Hódmezővásárhely: 62,445

Out of Hungary's ten largest cities in 1910, five are now located outside of Hungary as a result of post-World War I border changes.

See also 
 Regions of Hungary
 Counties of Hungary
 Districts of Hungary (from 2013)
 Subregions of Hungary (until 2013)
 Administrative divisions of the Kingdom of Hungary (until 1918)
 Counties of the Kingdom of Hungary
 Administrative divisions of the Kingdom of Hungary (1941–44)
 NUTS:HU

References

External links 
 Subdivisions of Hungary
 Gazetteer of Hungary (HCSO 2008)

Hungary
Demographics of Hungary
Hungary
 
Cities and towns